This is a list of football clubs that compete within the leagues and divisions of the English Women's Football League system as far down as the County Leagues at Levels 7-8.

List of Leagues and Divisions
Women's Super League (Level 1)
Women's Championship (Level 2)
National League Premier Division North / South (Level 3), Division One Midlands/North/South East/South West (Level 4)
Below these are the Regional Leagues:
East Midlands Regional League Premier Division (Level 5), Division One Central/North/South (Level 6)
Eastern Region League Premier Division (Level 5), Division One North/South (Level 6)
London & South East Regional League Premier Division (Level 5), Division One North/South (Level 6)
North East Regional League Premier Division (Level 5), Division One North/South (Level 6)
North West Regional League Premier Division (Level 5), Division One North/South (Level 6)
South West Regional League Premier Division  (Level 5), Division One East/North/West (Level 6)
Southern Region League Premier Division  (Level 5), Division One North/South (Level 6)
West Midlands Regional League Premier Division (Level 5), Division One North/South (Level 6)
Below these are the County Leagues:
Beds & Herts County League Premier Division (Level 7), Division One (Level 8) - there is also Division Two at Level 9.
Birmingham County League Premier Division (Level 7), Division One (Level 8)
Cambridgeshire County League Division One (Level 7), Division Two (Level 8) - there is also Division Three at Level 9.
Cheshire County League Premier Division (Level 7), Division One (Level 8)
Cornwall County League Division One (Level 7), Division Two (Level 8)
Derbyshire County League Division One (Level 7), Division Two (Level 8)
Devon County League North & East / South & West Divisions (Level 7)
Dorset County League Women's Division (Level 7)
Durham County League Division One (Level 7), Division Two/Development (Level 8)
East Riding County League Division One (Level 7)
Essex County League Premier Division (Level 7), Division One (Level 8) - there is also Division Two at Level 9.
Gloucestershire County League Division One (Level 7), Division Two (Level 8) - there is also Division Three at Level 9.
Greater London County League Premier Division (Level 7), Division One North/South (Level 8) - there is also Division Two Central & West/North at Level 9.
Greater Manchester County League Premier Division (Level 7), Division One (Level 8) - there is also Division Two at Level 9.
Hampshire County League Division One (Level 7), Division Two (Level 8) - there is also Divisions Three, Four, Five & Six at Levels 9-12.
Lancashire County League Premier Division (Level 7) / Division One North & West/South & East (Level 8)
Leicestershire County League Division One (Level 7), Division Two (Level 8)
Lincolnshire County League (Level 7)
Liverpool County League Division One (Level 7), Division Two (Level 8)
Midwest Counties League Division One (Level 7)
Norfolk County League Division One (Level 7), Division Two (Level 8)
North Riding League Women's Division (Level 7)
Northamptonshire County League Premier Division (Level 7), Division One (Level 8)
Nottinghamshire County League Division One (Level 7), Division Two (Level 8)
Sheffield & Hallamshire County League Division One (Level 7), Division Two (Level 8) - there is also Division Three at Level 9.
Somerset County League Division One (Level 7), Division Two North/South (Level 8)
South East Counties League Premier Division (Level 7), Surrey Premier Division / Kent Division One East/West (Level 8) - there is also Surrey Division One and Kent Division Two East/West at Level 9.
Staffordshire County League Premier Division (Level 7), Division One (Level 8)
Suffolk County League Premier Division (Level 7), Championship (Level 8)
Sussex County League Premier Division (Level 7), Division One (Level 8), Division Two (Level 9)
Thames Valley Counties League Division One (Level 7), Division Two (Level 8) - there is also Division Three North/South/West at Level 9.
West Riding County League Premier Division (Level 7), Division One (Level 8) - there is also Division Two, Three & Four at Levels 9-11.
Wiltshire County League Premier (Level 7)

Alphabetical list of Clubs
The divisions are correct for the 2022–23 season.

Key



A

B

C

D

E

F

G

H

I

J

K

L

M

N

O

P

Q

R

S

T

U

W

X

Y

See also
Women's association football
List of women's national football teams
List of women's football teams
International competitions in women's association football

References

External links
The FA Women's Page

 
England women
Women's